Clemensia ophrydina is a moth of the family Erebidae first described by Herbert Druce in 1885. It is found in Mexico, Guatemala and Ecuador.

References

Cisthenina
Moths described in 1885